Khafur (also Romanized as Khāfūr) is a village in Soltanabad Rural District, in the Central District of Ramhormoz County, Khuzestan Province, Iran. At the 2006 census, its population was 94, in 18 families.

References 

Populated places in Ramhormoz County